The 1963 World 600, the 4th running of the event, was a NASCAR Grand National Series race held on June 2, 1963 at Charlotte Motor Speedway in Charlotte, North Carolina. Contested over 400 laps on the 1.5 mile (2.4 km) speedway, it was the 26th race of the 1963 NASCAR Grand National Series season. Fred Lorenzen of Holman-Moody won the race.

Paul Clark and Banjo Matthews would depart from NASCAR after the race while Joe Weatherly took the championship lead from Richard Petty.

Background
Charlotte Motor Speedway is a motorsports complex located in Concord, North Carolina, United States, 13 miles from Charlotte, North Carolina. The complex features a 1.5 miles (2.4 km) quad oval track that hosts NASCAR racing including the prestigious World 600 on Memorial Day weekend and the National 400. The speedway was built in 1959 by Bruton Smith and is considered the home track for NASCAR with many race teams located in the Charlotte area. The track is owned and operated by Speedway Motorsports Inc. (SMI).

World 600

Race results

World 600 Qualifier

Race results

References

World 600
World 600
NASCAR races at Charlotte Motor Speedway
World 600